Prudovy is a rural locality (a settlement) in Svetloyarsky District, Volgograd Oblast, Russia. The population was 329 as of 2010. There are 9 streets.

Geography 
Prudovy is located 53 km southwest of Svetly Yar (the district's administrative centre) by road. Kanalnaya is the nearest rural locality.

References 

Rural localities in Svetloyarsky District